Alien Project is the stage name of Israeli psychedelic trance DJ and producer Ari Linker. He has also collaborated with other musicians in the groups Alien vs. The Cat (with Space Cat), Crunchy Punch (with Jean Borelli), N.B.K. (with Christophe Drouillet), and Save the Robot (with Ido Liran).

History
Ari Linker first began performing in Goa in 1994. He has been invited back to perform in Goa as a live act or DJ every year since then.

His first album as Alien Project was Midnight Sun, released on Phonokol in 2001. Israeli trance musician Astrix collaborated on four tracks on the album. The album also featured appearances from Jean Borelli, Orion, and Celli Firmi.

His second album, Aztechno Dream, was released on TIP.World in 2002. It featured trance musician Riktam (of GMS) on three of the tracks. The album also featured an appearance from psychedelic music pioneer Raja Ram.

His third album, Dance or Die, was released on Phonokol in 2002. It featured three collaborations with Astrix, one with GMS, two with Jean Borelli, one with Celli Firmi, and one with Serge Souque (of the group Total Eclipse).

In an interview in 2003, Astrix announced that he was collaborating with Alien Project on three new records, but the two musicians parted ways a short time later. He collaborated with Israeli trance musician Space Cat (Avi Algranati) in the project Alien vs. The Cat.

The fourth Alien Project album, Don't Worry Be Groovy!, was released on TIP.World in April 2004. It featured a collaboration with Jean Borelli and another collaboration with Raja Ram.

Discography 
 Midnight Sun (2001, Phonokol)
 Aztechno Dream (2002, TIP.World)
 Dance or Die (2002, Phonokol)
 Don't Worry Be Groovy! (2004, TIP.World)
 Activation Portal (2007)

References

External links 
 Alien Project on Discogs
 Alien Project on Soundcloud
 Alien Project on Spotify
 Alien Project on Instagram
 Ari Linker on myspace
 Alien Project on Facebook

Goa trance musicians
Israeli electronic musicians
Israeli psychedelic trance musicians
Musical groups established in 1994
Living people
Year of birth missing (living people)